Audioantics is a UK-based video game audio production company run by a freelance sound engineer Chris Chudley.

Selected works
Blood Stone - Xbox 360, PlayStation 3, PC (2010)
Blur - Xbox 360, PlayStation 3, PC (2010)
Geometry Wars: Touch - iOS4 (via iTunes App Store) (2010)
Geometry Wars: Retro Evolved 2 — Xbox Live Arcade (2008)
The Club — Xbox 360, PlayStation 3, PC (2008)
Geometry Wars: Galaxies - Nintendo DS, Wii (2007)
Project Gotham Racing 4 - Xbox 360 (2007)
Boom Boom Rocket — Xbox Live Arcade (2007)
Geometry Wars: Retro Evolved — Xbox Live Arcade (2005), Windows Vista (2007), Windows XP (via Steam) (2007)
Project Gotham Racing 3 — Xbox 360 (2005)
Project Gotham Racing 2 — Xbox (2003)

References

External links
 

Video game companies of the United Kingdom